The Cathedral Basilica of the Assumption of the Blessed Virgin Mary  also called Sosnowiec Cathedral is a religious building affiliated with the Catholic Church which is located in the city of Sosnowiec in the European country of Poland.

It is eclectic church built in 1899, on the plan of a Latin cross basilica type. As of 25 March 1992 is the cathedral of the Diocese of Sosnowiec.

The most important Catholic shrine of Sosnowiec was built between 1893 and 1899. In 1896 there was put into operation for the faithful the lower chapel. In 1899 the Bishop of Kielce Tomasz Kulinski erected a new parish, freeing it from the area of the parish of Czeladź. In the year 1901 there was put into operation the rectory.

In October 2014 it was affected by a fire.

See also
Roman Catholicism in Poland
Assumption Cathedral (disambiguation)

External links
 Sacred Restorations: Polish Cathedrals Built Anew

References

Roman Catholic cathedrals in Poland
Buildings and structures in Sosnowiec
Roman Catholic churches completed in 1899
Basilica churches in Poland
Churches in Silesian Voivodeship
19th-century Roman Catholic church buildings in Poland